Tribeniswar Temple is a Shaiva pitha of Odisha in India. This is one of a Patalaphuta Shivalinga temple dedicated to lord Shiva and located at Chasakhanda village (near Mauda Panchayat) of Mahanga in Cuttack district.

Roadway & communication
This temple is located 33 kilometers from North-East direction of Cuttack city and directly connected to NH-5 via Tangi and nearest Railway station is Byree Railway station, Sri Jhadeswar Road, Barithengarh and Tangi (Kapilas Road) . It can be communicated by few buses of Cuttack-Tribeniswar route.

References 

Hindu temples in Cuttack
Shiva temples in Odisha